Bota is a 2014 Albanian drama film directed by Iris Elezi and Thomas Logoreci. The film was selected as the Albanian entry for the Best Foreign Language Film at the 88th Academy Awards but it was not nominated. The directors won the Fedeora Award at the Karlovy Vary International Film Festival 2014 for this film.

Plot 
The families of Juli, Nora and Beni were resettled during the communist rule to a small village in no man's land on the edge of a swamp. In present-day Albania, Juli works at her uncle Beni's café Bota. She lives with her grandmother Noje and takes care of her. Nora, Juli's friend, becomes Beni's mistress. Beni wants to expand the café and tries to attract new customers. With the expansion of the highway near the village, the peaceful life of the protagonists ends.

Cast
 Flonja Kodheli as July
 Artur Gorishti as Beni
 Fioralba Kryemadhi as Nora
 Tinka Kurti as Noje
 Luca Lionello as Filipo

See also
 List of submissions to the 88th Academy Awards for Best Foreign Language Film
 List of Albanian submissions for the Academy Award for Best Foreign Language Film

References

External links
 

2014 films
2014 drama films
Albanian drama films
Albanian-language films